Borborillus is a genus of flies belonging to the family lesser dung flies.

Species
B. uncinatus (Duda, 1923)
B. vitripennis (Meigen, 1830)

References

Sphaeroceridae
Diptera of Europe
Taxa named by Oswald Duda
Sphaeroceroidea genera